Faxonius saxatilis is a species of crayfish in the family Cambaridae. It is endemic to tributaries of the Kiamichi River, Le Flore County, Oklahoma. Its common name is Kiamichi crayfish.

References

Cambaridae
Endemic fauna of the United States
Freshwater crustaceans of North America
Taxonomy articles created by Polbot
Crustaceans described in 1976
Taxobox binomials not recognized by IUCN  
Endemic fauna of Oklahoma